Wayne Mitchell may refer to:

 Wayne Mitchell (singer), American gospel singer
 Wayne Mitchell (politician), Native American politician